The list of Olympic men's ice hockey players for Hungary consists of 32 skaters and 6 goaltenders. Men's ice hockey tournaments have been staged at the Olympic Games since 1920 (it was introduced at the 1920 Summer Olympics, and was permanently added to the Winter Olympic Games in 1924). Hungary has participated in three tournaments: 1928, 1936 and 1964. Hungary has never won a medal in ice hockey, with their highest finish being seventh in 1936.  

Two players, Miklós Barcza and Sandro Magyar played in more than one tournament, representing Hungary at both the 1928 and 1936 Winter Olympics, and therefor played in the most games, with 9 each. Sándor Miklós scored the most goals (8) and had the most points (9), while Viktor Zsitva had the most assists (2), though assists were not often recorded in the early Olympics.

Key

Goaltenders

Skaters

Notes

References
 
 
 

Hungary men's national ice hockey team
ice hockey
Hungary
Hungary